Magnistipula cuneatifolia is a species of plant in the family Chrysobalanaceae. It is found in Cameroon and Gabon. Its natural habitat is subtropical or tropical dry forests. It is threatened by habitat loss.

References

Chrysobalanaceae
Critically endangered plants
Taxonomy articles created by Polbot